Yasny is a rural locality (a settlement) in Oktyabrsky Selsoviet of Zeysky District, Amur Oblast, Russia. The population was 8 as of 2018.

Geography 
Yasny is located near the left bank of the Dep River, 171 km southeast of Zeya (the district's administrative centre) by road. Yubileyny is the nearest rural locality.

References 

Rural localities in Zeysky District